Carrabba's Italian Grill (or simply Carrabba's) is an American restaurant chain featuring Italian-American cuisine. It is owned and operated by Bloomin' Brands, and headquartered in Tampa, Florida.

History

The chain was founded on December 26, 1986, by John Charles "Johnny" Carrabba III and his uncle Damian Mandola. Together, they opened the first restaurant on Kirby Drive in Houston, Texas. A second location was opened soon after at the intersection of Woodway and Voss Road. After a considerable enlargement of the restaurant, it was renamed "Rosie Carrabba's" in honor of Damian's sister Rose. Johnny Carrabba and his family are still the proprietors of both original locations.

In January 1993, under a joint venture with Outback Steakhouse, Inc. (the predecessor to Bloomin' Brands), 10 new Carrabba's locations were opened in Houston and Florida. Two years later, OSI acquired the rights to develop the Carrabba's chain nationwide.

In 2008, OSI teamed up with HMSHost to open the first airport location in Tampa International Airport.

As of 2013, there were more Carrabba's restaurants in Florida—home to parent company Bloomin' Brands' corporate headquarters—than any other state in the United States.

In 2015, the first Carrabba's international location opened in Brazil, rebranded as "Abbraccio"

In 2020, Carrabba's expanded into Canada, opening a location in Moncton, New Brunswick.

In 2021 Bloomin Brands bought out the founders of Carrabba’s Italian Grill in a royalty termination agreement. As part of the agreement the founders kept their original two locations in Houston.

Menu
Many of the recipes for the dishes on Carrabba's menu are those of Damian's mother, Grace, and his sister, Rose. These recipes were featured on the PBS cooking show Cucina Sicilia, which is hosted by Carrabba and Mandola.

Chicken Bryan, one of Carrabba's Italian Grill's dishes, features an 8 oz grilled chicken breast, topped with goat cheese, sundried tomatoes, and a basil lemon-butter sauce. The dish is named after the city of Bryan (Texas), where the Carrabba family settled.

References

Further reading

External links
 
 Bloomin' Brands website

Companies based in Tampa, Florida
Italian-American cuisine
Italian restaurants
Restaurants established in 1986
Restaurant chains in the United States
1986 establishments in Texas
Bloomin' Brands
American companies established in 1986